InfoMania (stylized as infoMania) is an American half-hour weekly satirical news-show that aired on the Current TV television network from 2007 to 2011. The program was initially hosted by Conor Knighton and later Brett Erlich, with features by Ben Hoffman, Sergio Cilli, Sarah Haskins, Bryan Safi, Erin Gibson, and Ellen Fox.

History
The program's executive producer was David Nickoll. Its original executive producer was The Daily Show's co-creator Madeleine Smithberg. For the majority of the show's life, the EP was Jeffrey Plunkett.

Stylistically similar to The Daily Show, InfoMania put a comedic spin on various pieces of popular culture in the United States, including outrageous news stories, video games, viral videos, as well as movies and music.

Prior to being produced in a full half-hour format, the show aired in short 3-5 minute installments, usually at the top of the hour. Before July 2007, the show rotated between names of Google Current and Current Buzz and was a part of Current TV's original programming when the network went on air in August 2005.

In September 2010, InfoMania began receiving a noticeable amount of negative feedback from their fanbase via Facebook and Current TV's website. This first came about following the removal of the ability to watch full episodes of the show on their website, as well as the addition of a live audience to the show. Current TV eliminated the audience from the show in response to these complaints, but they still refuse to post full episodes to the Internet.

On January 12, 2011 Conor Knighton announced his departure on the Current TV website. Brett Erlich became the new host with a new set, but kept the same correspondents returning January 20, 2011.

On July 1, 2011, Brett Erlich announced the July 15th episode would be the final episode of InfoMania.

The show aired Thursday at 11 pm ET/8 pm PT on Current TV before switching to Friday nights during its final month of production. Various segments can be viewed online at various social networking websites such as Hulu.

InfoMania was produced on the same lot as Mad Men in Hollywood, California.

Correspondents
 Sergio Cilli featured segments "White Hot Top 5" and "Music Intervention"
 Ben Hoffman featured segments "InfoMania Editorial," "InfoMania Tech Report," "Kids Kouch!," and "Craigslist Interviews"
 Bryan Safi featured segment "That's Gay"
 Sarah Haskins featured segment "Target: Women"
 Erin Gibson featured segment "Modern Lady"
 Brett Erlich featured segments "Viral Video Film School" and "Rotten Tomatoes on InfoMania" (co-hosted with Ellen Fox)

Segments

References

External links

 Erin Gibson on podcast

2007 American television series debuts
2011 American television series endings
2000s American satirical television series
2010s American satirical television series
2000s American television news shows
2010s American television news shows
American news parodies
Current TV original programming
English-language television shows